Stegny is a neighborhood in Mokotów district of Warsaw, Poland.  It is primarily residential, with several small retail centers and "convenience" shops including small grocery stores, butchers shops, bakeries, and the like.  Stegny is characterized by its many concrete high-rise apartment buildings, constructed during the 1970s under Communist rule.  These building are so alike in appearance that they have been painted various colors to allow local residents to tell them apart.  Additionally, there are several apartment blocks of only five stories and many newer single-family townhouses that have been built since the 1990s.

Neighbourhoods of Mokotów

 sup